Frédéric Lavenir (born 11 June 1960) is a French business executive who has served as the CEO of CNP Assurances, from September 2012 to July, 2018. Prior to that, he was employed as an executive at BNP Paribas within the leasing and human resources divisions. Prior to joining that firm, he was the Deputy Director of the Economy, Finance and Industry for France, and before that he was an administrator for Trésor public. He graduated from HEC Paris and École nationale d'administration.

On July the 11th 2018, he resigned for "personal reasons" from his position at CNP Assurances.

References

1960 births
Living people
French chief executives
Grandes écoles alumni
HEC Paris alumni